Ruairí Canavan (born 2003) is a Gaelic footballer who plays for Errigal Ciarán and the Tyrone county team. He is the son of Peter Canavan, a former All-Ireland winning captain with Tyrone.

Playing career

Club
Canavan made his Tyrone Senior Football Championship debut on 10 October 2021. He scored five points from the bench in a twelve-point win over Clonoe.

On 30 October 2022, Canavan played in his first county final, with Errigal Ciarán facing Carrickmore. Errigal won the match by 2–11 to 1–12, with Canavan scoring two points.

Inter-county

Minor and under-20
On 14 July 2019, the Tyrone minor team faced Monaghan in the Ulster final. Canavan came on as a second-half substitute as Monaghan won the match by two points.

On 22 April 2022, Canavan was in the half-forward line as the Tyrone under-20 team faced Cavan in the Ulster final. Canavan kicked seven points from placed balls, including a sideline. Tyrone held on to win the match by 0–11 to 0–10, with Canavan being named man of the match. Canavan put in another man of the match performance on 8 May, scoring 0–8 in the All-Ireland semi-final win over Kerry. On 14 May Tyrone faced Kildare in the All-Ireland final. Canavan was once again the hero, scoring 1–7 as Tyrone were crowned All-Ireland champions with a six-point win. Canavan was named U20 Footballer of the Year for his performances in the championship.

Canavan was named captain of the under-20 team for the 2023 season.

Senior
Canavan joined the Tyrone senior panel after the All-Ireland Under-20 win in May 2022.

On 19 February 2023, Canavan made his National League debut as a late sub in a loss to Galway. Canavan scored his first point for Tyrone the next week, as Tyrone suffered a heavy loss to Mayo.

Honours
Tyrone
 All-Ireland Under-20 Football Championship (1): 2022
 Ulster Under-20 Football Championship (1): 2022

Errigal Ciarán
 Tyrone Senior Football Championship (1): 2022

Individual
 Eirgrid Under-20 Footballer of the Year (1): 2022
 Eirgrid 20 Under-20 Award (1): 2022

References

2003 births
Living people
Tyrone inter-county Gaelic footballers
Errigal Ciarán Gaelic footballers